The National Centre of Trade Unions of Turkmenistan is the sole trade union centre in Turkmenistan. It is a continuation of the Soviet model of trade union. It claims a membership of 1.3 million.

References

Trade unions in Turkmenistan